The 1952 La Flèche Wallonne was the 16th edition of La Flèche Wallonne cycle race and was held on 10 May 1952. The race started in Charleroi and finished in Liège. The race was won by Ferdinand Kübler.

General classification

References

1952 in road cycling
1952
1952 in Belgian sport
1952 Challenge Desgrange-Colombo